The Thomas Barron House is a historic house located at 1160 Canandaigua Road in Seneca, Ontario County, New York.

Description and history 
It was constructed in 1848 by Thomas Barron, and is a distinct example of vernacular, Greek Revival style, cobblestone domestic architecture. The house consists of a two-story main block flanked by -story wings. The exterior walls are built of oval-shaped, red sandstone lake-washed cobbles. The main block features a pedimented portico supported by four large fluted columns of the Ionic order.

It was listed on the National Register of Historic Places on October 6, 1988.

References

Houses on the National Register of Historic Places in New York (state)
Greek Revival houses in New York (state)
Cobblestone architecture
Houses completed in 1848
Houses in Ontario County, New York
National Register of Historic Places in Ontario County, New York